Specaria is a genus of annelids belonging to the family Naididae.

The species of this genus are found in Eurasia and Northern America.

Species:
 Specaria fraseri Brinkhurst, 1978 
 Specaria helleri (Brinkhurst & Jamieson, 1971)

References

Naididae